Boot  is a village in Kapurthala district of Punjab State, India. The village is administrated by a Sarpanch, who is an elected representative.

Demography 
According to the report published by Census India in 2011, Boot has a total number of 623 houses and population of 3,757 of which include 1,979 males and 1,778 females. Literacy rate of Boot is   50.13%, lower than state average of 75.84%.  The population of children under the age of 6 years is 607 which is 16.16% of total population of Boot, and child sex ratio is approximately  977, higher than state average of 846.

Population data

Air travel connectivity 
The closest airport to the village is Sri Guru Ram Dass Jee International Airport.

Villages in Kapurthala

External links
  Villages in Kapurthala
 Kapurthala Villages List

References

Villages in Kapurthala district